Getica is a historical book, "De origine actibusque Getarum" ("The Origin and Deeds of the Getae/Goths") written by Jordanes in the 6th century.

Getica may also refer to:

 Getica (Dio), a historical book which Suidas, Jordanes, and Freculphus attribute to Cassius Dio, while Philostratus sees Dio Chrysostom as its author
 Getica (Criton), a work on the history of the Getae by Criton of Heraclea, which was at the basis of Emperor Trajan's work, Dacica
 Getica (Pârvan) (1926), a book covering the ancient history of the Geto-Dacians by the Romanian historian and archaeologist Vasile Pârvan

See also
 Goetica